Caesar is a village in the Mazowe West District located within the province of Mashonaland west, Zimbabwe. According to the 1982 Population Census, the village had a population of 2,674. The village grew up around the Caesar Mine which is a chromite mine.

Populated places in Mashonaland West Province